Samuel Owen (1769? – 8 December 1857) was an English marine painter and illustrator.

Life and works

Owen was born about 1769. Nothing is recorded of him before 1791, when he exhibited "A Sea View" at the Royal Academy. These, with three other drawings exhibited in 1802 and 1807, complete the number of his exhibits at the Royal Academy.

In 1808 he joined the "Associated Artists in Water-Colours", and sent eleven drawings of shipping and marine subjects to the first exhibition of that short-lived body. He also exhibited twelve works in 1809, and six in 1810, but after that date resigned his membership. His works were carefully drawn and freshly coloured, with great attention to the details of shipping. "Among them are the series of 84 drawings which were engraved by William Bernard Cooke for his work 'The Thames'",<ref>William Bernard Cooke & Samuel Owen. The Thames: volume 1, Volume 2  (Vernor, Hood & Sharpe and W.B. Cooke, 1811).</ref> published in 1811, and eleven others made for the "Picturesque Tour of the River Thames", published by William Westall, R.A., and himself in 1838.

Owen died at Sunbury in Surrey, on 8 December 1867, in his 89th year, but had long before ceased to practise his art.

Other pictures (in the South Kensington Museum c. 1885) of his include : 'Shipping in a Calm,' 'Indiaman lying-to for a Pilot,' 'Luggers on the Shore,' and seven other river and sea pictures. A small half-length portrait of Owen in watercolours, signed 'Montague, 1805,' was in the possession of Dr. Edward H. <surname missing> of Lewisham High Road.

References

External links
Works by Owen at the NMM (National Maritime Museum, Greenwich, London)
HMS Dido engaging the French frigate La Minerve, with H.M.S. Lowestoft chasing L'Artémise beyond, 24 June 1795 (Watercolour - Christie's)
A frigate and smaller craft in a stiff breeze off the North Foreland (Watercolour - Christie's)
An English frigate heeling in the swell off a fortified tower  (Watercolour - Christie's)
Antique prints of Owen's work (Grosvenor prints)
 , a painting engraved by E. Finden for the Forget Me Not annual for 1827, with a poem The Cliff's of Dover'' by Felicia Hemans.

18th-century English painters
English male painters
19th-century English painters
British marine artists
English watercolourists
English illustrators
1769 births
1857 deaths
19th-century English male artists
18th-century English male artists